is an anime series consisting of 25 episodes.

It was first aired on TV Asahi on 13 October 1973 and concluded on 30 March 1974.

Episodes
Cutie Honey